Three Way Mirror is singer-songwriter Livingston Taylor's fourth album, released in 1978.

Its ten tracks produced the song that was perhaps Taylor's biggest hit, "I Will Be In Love With You", as well as "Going Round One More Time", later covered by Taylor's brother James on his 1985 album That's Why I'm Here.

Record World said that "I'll Come Running" "has an easy jazz beat and Taylor's smooth vocals for accent."

Taylor promoted the album by touring as the opening act for Linda Ronstadt during her "Living in the USA" national tour.

Track listing
 "Going Round One More Time"
 "L.A. Serenade"
 "Gonna Have a Good Time"
 "Train Off The Track"
 "I Will Be in Love With You"
 "No Thank You Skycap"
 "I'll Come Running"
 "Living Without You"
 "Southern Kids"
 "How Much Your Sweet Love Means to Me"

Personnel
Livingston Taylor – Guitar, keyboards, vocals
Mike Baird — Drums
Gary Coleman — Marimba
Nick DeCaro – Producer, Arranger and Accordion
Frank DeCaro – Music Contractor and Album Supervisor
Joe DiBlasi – Acoustic guitar
Linda Dillard – Background vocals
Scott Edwards – Bass
Shelby Flint — Background vocals
Steve Forman – Percussion
Ed Greene — Drums
Jerry Hey — Flugelhorn
David Hungate — Bass
Jon Joyce – Background vocals
Jim Keltner — Drums
Steve Madaio – Flugelhorn
Maria Muldaur — Vocals
Brian Ray – Electric guitar 
Lee Ritenour — Electric guitar
Fred Tackett — Acoustic guitar
Billy Joe Walker Jr. — Acoustic guitar, electric guitar
Jai Winding – Piano

Charts
Singles – Billboard (North America)

References

Three Way Mirror
Three Way Mirror
Epic Records albums